William South (c. 1734 - 13 September 1791) was a Derby-winning British jockey. At the age of 54, he won the ninth running of the race on the horse Sir Thomas, trained by Frank Neale and owned by George, Prince of Wales, the future George IV.

Major wins 
 Great Britain
Epsom Derby - Sir Thomas (1788)

References 

British Champion flat jockeys

1791 deaths
Year of birth uncertain